Sawah Ring is a village in Tangkak District, Johor, Malaysia.  This village is famous for the Mount Ledang scenery that can be seen from the paddy field.  With a growing number of tourists coming to Sawah Ring, the village is experiencing rapid growth within 50 years of its creation.  Sawah Ring consist a total of 6 alleys, Lorong 1, Lorong 2, Lorong 3, Lorong 4, Lorong 5, and Lorong 6. The first three alley are known as Kampung Sawah Ring while the last three are known as Kampung Baru Sawah Ring.

The acting village chief is Hussin Bin Mohammad.

Education
Education of Sawah Ring's younger generation is provided by the schools in Muar.

Government schools
 SK Sawah Ring
 Tadika Kemas

State schools
 Sekolah Agama Sawah Ring

Economy
Most of the villagers grow paddy initially. However, as time goes by, the young generations tend to work in factory or move to bigger towns.

In early 2006, the village has been struck by a gigantic storm.  The storm has caused massive damage to the villagers and approximately 40 families were affected.  However, the tragedy did not slow down the economy of Sawah Ring, but it has attracted private media like TV3, Johor state government and even some people from Kelantan to help rebuild Sawah Ring.

Infrastructure
 Jabatan Pertanian Sawah Ring
 Jabatan Pengairan dan Saliran (JPS)
 Tanki Air SJS
 Masjid Gaung Kepar
 Surau Sawah Ring
 Jambatan Sawah Ring

Notable people
 Co-founder of OurPetronas Ltd, Noor Hafiz
 Amway Malaysia Future CEO, Fariz Hamdi
 Malaysia Future Takraw coach, Amirul Hakim

References

Villages in Johor
Towns, suburbs and villages in Muar
Muar District